Timothy Jackson Sullivan (born April 15, 1944) was the twenty-fifth president of the College of William and Mary in Williamsburg, Virginia, United States. On July 1, 2005, he was succeeded by Gene Nichol, former dean of the law school at the University of North Carolina.

References

Living people
People from Virginia
People from Portage County, Ohio
Presidents of the College of William & Mary
College of William & Mary alumni
College of William & Mary faculty
Harvard Law School alumni
Virginia lawyers
1944 births